The Battle of Santiago (1660) was an engagement between Dominican militia and French buccaneers.

Conflict
Pirates out of Tortuga attacked the Dominican town of Santiago de los Caballeros on March 27, 1660. Some 25 or 30 Spaniards were killed outright during their initial onslaught. After ransacking the town, they departed with a number of hostages on March 29, 1660. Several hundred Dominican militia cavalrymen had in the interim managed to rally from throughout the district, and prepared an ambush ahead of the French column. The leading two buccaneers were shot dead and a two-hour firefight ensued, before the Dominicans finally broke.

See also
 Battle of Sabana Real
 Dominican-French War

References

History of the Colony of Santo Domingo
Santiago 1660
Santiago 1660
Santiago